Majorna was until 2011 one of the 21 boroughs of Gothenburg Municipality.  Since 2011 it is joined with the former borough of Linnéstaden and they do together form the new borough of "Majorna-Linné". 

It was composed of four districts:
 Kungsladugård
 Majorna
 Sanna
 Stigberget

See also
 Boroughs and districts of Gothenburg

boroughs of Gothenburg

fr:Majorna
sv:Majorna